Mark Philippoussis and Patrick Rafter were the defending champions but they competed with different partners that year, Philippoussis with Goran Ivanišević and Rafter with Jonas Björkman.

Ivanišević and Philippoussis lost in the first round to Max Mirnyi and Michael Sell.

Björkman and Rafter were one of the two teams in the final along with Todd Woodbridge and Mark Woodforde.

There was no result for the event due to rain.

Seeds
The top four seeded teams received byes into the second round.

Draw

Finals

Top half

Bottom half

External links
 1998 Stella Artois Championships Doubles Draw

Doubles